South Carolina Highway 133 (SC 133) is a  state highway in Pickens County, South Carolina, connecting Clemson and western Pickens County with access to the Blue Ridge Mountains and the SC 11 (Cherokee Foothills Scenic Highway).

Route description
The route of SC 133 travels generally in a south–north direction, beginning at an intersection with U.S. Routes 76 (US 76) and 123 and SC 28 in Clemson. SC 133 passes under a Norfolk Southern railway viaduct and leaves the Clemson area, passing by Lake Hartwell. The highway skirts rural areas west of Central before entering the community of Six Mile. North of Six Mile, SC 133 becomes more rural and hilly in nature before terminating at SC 11, near Lake Jocassee and Devils Fork State Park.

Prior to streetscaping activities in downtown Clemson, the route used to include College Avenue and terminated at SC 93 at the front of the campus of Clemson University.

History

Junction list

See also

References

External links

SC 133 at Virginia Highways' South Carolina Highways Annex

133
Transportation in Pickens County, South Carolina